Testosterone hexahydrobenzylcarbonate (brand name Lontanyl), or testosterone cyclohexylmethylcarbonate, is an androgen and anabolic steroid and a testosterone ester.

References

Androgens and anabolic steroids
Androstanes
Carbonate esters
Testosterone esters